Krishen Jit a/l Amar Singh (July 10, 1939 – April 28, 2005) was a Malaysian author, playwright and theatre director and critic remembered as a Malaysian theatre icon. He was a co-founder of Five Arts Center with his wife, Marion D’ Cruz and other artists including Chin San Sooi and Redza Piyadasa in 1984. Jit also worked as the acting coach for the 2004 film Puteri Gunung Ledang directed by Saw Teong Hin starring M. Nasir and Tiara Jacquelina. He died on 28 April 2005 at the University Malaya Medical Centre (PPUM) at the age of 65 after a long battle with stroke.

The Astro-Krishen Jit Fund was established by Malaysian satellite TV operator ASTRO was named after him. Jit also a recipient of the Lifetime Achievement Award at the BOH Cameronian Awards, which was first held in 2003.

His book Krishen Jit: An Uncommon Position - Selected Writings was published in 2003 by Contemporary Asian Arts Centre, edited by Kathy Roland and Baha Zain.

References

External links
 

1939 births
2005 deaths
Malaysian dramatists and playwrights
Malaysian writers
Malaysian theatre people
Malaysian Hindus